Burnin' the Ice is a studio album by the German band Die Haut, featuring collaborations with Nick Cave. It was released in 1983 by record label Paradoxx.

Track listing
Lyrics by Nick Cave

Side A

Side B

Personnel
Nick Cave - vocals on "Stow-a-Way", "Truck Love", "Pleasure Is the Boss" and "Dumb Europe"
Martin Peter, Remo Park - guitar
Christoph Dreher - bass
Thomas Wydler - drums
with:
Susanne Kuhnke - bass synthesizer on "Stow-a-Way"
Technical
Rainer Rulow - engineer
Yadegar Asisi Namini - cover

Reception 

Exclaim! wrote that the album "serves to be a powerful auditory snapshot of that particular era of artistic creation in Berlin, if nothing more."

References

External links 

 

1983 albums
Die Haut albums